Gilber Jean-Baptiste (born February 19, 1973) is a retired Haitian-Canadian soccer defender who played professionally in the USL A-League.  He earned six cap with the Haiti national football team

Youth
Born in Haiti, Jean-Baptiste grew up in Montreal, Quebec, Canada.  In 1995, he moved to the United States to attend Mercer County Community College where he played a single season of college soccer.  He was a 1995 NJCAA First Team All American.  Jean-Baptiste transferred to Southern Connecticut State University for the next three seasons.  In 1998, his senior season, the Owls won the NCAA Division II Men's Soccer Championship and Jean-Baptiste was a First Team Division II All American and the NCAA Division II Player of the Year.  He graduated with a bachelor's degree in computer science.

Club
In 1999, Jean-Baptiste turned professional with the Charleston Battery of the USL A-League.  He was named Second Team All League his rookie season.  He was also a 2001 First Team All League defender.  On February 28, 2002, Jean-Baptiste signed with the Atlanta Silverbacks.  He retired at the end of the 2002 season and entered coaching.

International
In 2000, Jean-Baptiste earned his first cap with the Haiti national football team in a 1–1 tie with Peru in the 2000 CONCACAF Gold Cup.  He went on to earn six caps, his last coming in 2002.

Career
Currently, Jean-Baptiste is a Computer Science teacher at Atlanta International School.

References

External links
 Gilbert Jean-Baptiste at Blessed Trinity
 Jean-Baptiste at Charleston Battery
 

Living people
1973 births
Haitian footballers
Haitian expatriate footballers
Haiti international footballers
Haitian football managers
Atlanta Silverbacks players
Charleston Battery players
Southern Connecticut Fighting Owls men's soccer players
A-League (1995–2004) players
2000 CONCACAF Gold Cup players
2002 CONCACAF Gold Cup players
Expatriate soccer players in the United States
Haitian expatriate sportspeople in the United States
Association football defenders